is a 2012 Japanese 3D music documentary film directed by Tetsuaki Matsue. It was released on 19 January 2013 in Japan.

Cast
Goma
Kosuke Tsuji
Kenta Tajika
Kyoichi Shiin

Reception
The film was in competition at the 25th Tokyo International Film Festival, in October 2012. It opened the 14th Cinemanila International Film Festival, on 5 December 2012 and also the 1st Helsinki Cine Aasia, on 14 March 2013. It was also shown at the 13th Japanese Film Festival Nippon Connection in June 2013.

Mark Adams, on Screen Daily, said the film was "more art installation than formal feature documentary".

Accolades
It was chosen as the 5th best film at the 23rd Japan Film Professional Awards, as the 8th best Japanese film of the year by film magazine Eiga Geijutsu and as the 10th best Japanese film of the year by film magazine Kinema Junpo.

References

External links
 

2012 3D films
2012 documentary films
2012 films
Japanese 3D films
Japanese documentary films
3D documentary films
2010s Japanese films